Edward Leigh (born 1950) is a British Conservative Party politician.

Edward Leigh may also refer to:
Edward Leigh (writer) (1602–1671), known for his works on religious topics, and Member of the Long Parliament
Edward Chandos Leigh (1832–1915), British cricketer and barrister
Edward Leigh (cricketer, born 1913) (1913–1994), English cricketer
Edward Leigh, 5th Baron Leigh (1742–1786)
Ed Leigh (born 1975), British television presenter

See also
Edward Lee (disambiguation)
Edward Lea (1837–1863), U.S. naval officer